Irrational Games (known as 2K Boston between 2007 and 2009) was an American video game developer founded in 1997 by three former employees of Looking Glass Studios: Ken Levine, Jonathan Chey, and Robert Fermier. Take-Two Interactive acquired the studio in 2006. The studio was known for its games System Shock 2, Freedom Force, SWAT 4, and most notably, two of the games in the BioShock series. In 2014, following the release of BioShock Infinite, Levine opted to significantly restructure the studio from around 90 to 15 employees and focus more on narrative games. In February 2017, the studio announced that it had been rebranded as Ghost Story Games and considered a fresh start from the original Irrational name, though still operating at the same business subsidiary under Take-Two.

History 
 1997 – Irrational Games studio formed by former Looking Glass Studios employees Ken Levine, Jonathan Chey, and Robert Fermier.
 1999 – System Shock 2, co-developed with Looking Glass Studios, released to critical acclaim.
 2000 – "Irrational Games Australia" studio is opened in Canberra, with Jonathan Chey taking the helm. Deep Cover is cancelled.
 2002 – Legal issues with publisher Crave Entertainment result in the development of The Lost being halted.
 2004 – Irrational designers Ed Orman and Dean Tate awarded "Best Design" in the Australian Game Developer Awards, as well as the studio receiving "Best Game of 2004" and "Best PC Game" for the game Tribes Vengeance.
 2005 – Irrational's Boston studio moves to larger office space in Quincy, Massachusetts. The studio retains the "Irrational Games Boston" title.
 2006 – Irrational is acquired by Take-Two Interactive, under the 2K publishing arm.
 2007 – Irrational Games is renamed to 2K Boston and 2K Australia on August 10. BioShock released August 21 to wide critical acclaim and strong sales.
 2010 – 2K Boston announces its return to its original name, "Irrational Games" on January 8.
 2013 - Irrational Games releases BioShock Infinite on 26 March to critical acclaim, selling 11 million copies as of May 2015.

Shortly after BioShock was released, rumors arose that many of the staff who had worked on the game were leaving 2K Boston/Australia. In 2007, five members of the 2K Boston team moved to a new 2K studio in Novato, California. Soon after, 2K announced the formation of 2K Marin in Novato.

In late July 2010, several media outlets reported that a recently created website, whatisicarus.com, was a promotion relating to Irrational Games' unannounced project. The following week, information about the game was again teased, with the trailer confirmed for release on August 12, 2010. This was eventually revealed to be BioShock Infinite.

Before Irrational started development on BioShock Infinite, the studio did preliminary work for the XCOM project that later became The Bureau: XCOM Declassified.

Restructuring and rebranding 

Development on BioShock Infinite, what would be Irrational's last game, started in 2008, about half a year after completion of the original BioShock. Following the game's public announcement in 2010, the company was pressured by 2K Games and the gaming consumers to make sure the title lived up to the expectations that the promotional material had set for it. Irrational hired more staff and allocated work to additional studios to help with the game, but this only served to complicate matters; from post-mortem interviews with Irrational staff, Levine was continually changing some of the core story beats for the game, which would dramatically change game assets that had already developed. Levine also admitted to difficulties in managing the larger staff. Conflicts over development leadership led to the departure of some high-level individuals in 2012. To bring the game back onto schedule for release, 2K hired industry professionals to assist Levine in managing the large team and focusing the game's content including eliminating planned multiplayer modes. BioShock Infinite was released by March 2013.

On February 18, 2014, Levine announced that the vast majority of the Irrational Games studio staff would be laid off, with all but fifteen members of the staff losing their positions. Levine said that he wanted to start "a smaller, more entrepreneurial endeavor at Take-Two," speaking to how much stress completing a large game like BioShock: Infinite had caused him. Levine said, "I need to refocus my energy on a smaller team with a flatter structure and a more direct relationship with gamers. In many ways, it will be a return to how we started: a small team making games for the core gaming audience." Levine had considered starting a new development studio for this, knowing that building the ideas would take several years before any game product would be made. Still, Take-Two offered to let him keep the division within Take-Two, with Levine saying that they told him, "there was no better place to pursue this new chapter than within their walls." The studio helped to find positions for the displaced employees, and 2K hosted a career day for the remaining 75 employees to help seek employment at 57 other studios.

Levine and the 15 remaining members of the team began the process of creating new, smaller games focusing on a replayable narrative for the core gamers. It was said that Levine's studio would continue to keep the Irrational name, although Take-Two later stated that it was not true. From 2014 to 2015, Irrational Games continued to post several openings for jobs at the studio. In January 2015, Levine and the remaining staff are currently developing their first game, which will be a "first-person sci-fi" game.

On February 22, 2017, the studio announced it had rebranded itself as Ghost Story Games, founded by 12 of the former Irrational members with Levine continuing as president and creative director. The studio's focus is "to create immersive, story-driven games for people who love games that ask something of them"; the name was chosen as ghost stories "are immersive, exciting, and steeped in community," similar to the studio's design philosophies. As of this point, the studio had about 25 employees.

Games developed

As Irrational Games

As 2K Boston

Cancelled video games 
 Deep Cover
 Division 9
 Dungeon Duel
 Monster Island
 The Lost
 Freedom Force 3
 Untitled BioShock game for PlayStation Vita

References

External links 
 

 
1997 establishments in Massachusetts
2017 disestablishments in Massachusetts
2K (company)
BioShock (series)
Companies based in Norfolk County, Massachusetts
Defunct companies based in Massachusetts
Defunct video game companies of the United States
Take-Two Interactive divisions and subsidiaries
Video game companies disestablished in 2017
Video game companies established in 1997
Video game development companies
Westwood, Massachusetts